Leucanopsis boliviana is a moth of the family Erebidae. It was described by Paul Dognin in 1922. It is found in Bolivia, Peru and Ecuador.

References

 Natural History Museum Lepidoptera generic names catalog

boliviana
Moths described in 1922